The Kentucky High School Athletic Association (KHSAA) is the governing body of athletic programs for junior and senior high schools in the state of Kentucky.  It conducts state championship competitions in all the KHSAA-sanctioned sports.

Fall sports

Cross country

Field hockey

Football

Golf

Soccer

Volleyball

Winter sports

Boys' basketball

Girls' basketball

Swimming and diving

Wrestling

Spring sports

Baseball

Softball

Tennis

Track and field

See also
 List of high schools in Kentucky
 Kentucky High School Athletic Association

External links
Kentucky High School Athletic Association official website

References

High school sports in Kentucky